The 1991 British Grand Prix was a Formula One motor race held at Silverstone on 14 July 1991. It was the eighth race of the 1991 FIA Formula One World Championship.

The 59-lap race was won from pole position by local driver Nigel Mansell, driving a Williams-Renault. Gerhard Berger finished second in a McLaren-Honda, with Alain Prost third in a Ferrari. Drivers' Championship leader, Ayrton Senna, ran out of fuel in the second McLaren-Honda on the final lap and was classified fourth. As well as winning from pole position, Mansell led every lap and posted the fastest lap of the race. It was the first of two consecutive grand slams at the Silverstone circuit for Mansell, who repeated the feat the following year in 1992.

Pre-race
Mansell-Mania greeted the drivers as they arrived at Silverstone for the British Grand Prix. The track had been vastly remodelled for 1991, which garnered largely positive reviews from the drivers. The track was no longer the fastest on the F1 calendar, but it now included many challenging corners for the drivers.  Elsewhere Tom Walkinshaw had bought a 35% stake in the Benetton team, but the driver line-ups were unchanged from the previous race. Stefan Johansson continued to stand-in for the injured Alex Caffi at Footwork, although it was the last race he would do so.

Qualifying

Pre-qualifying report
The Friday morning pre-qualifying session resulted in a return to the Dallara / Jordan lockout seen three times earlier in the season. JJ Lehto was fastest in the Dallara, with Andrea de Cesaris' Jordan nearly seven tenths of a second slower in second position. Third was the Dallara of Emanuele Pirro, with Bertrand Gachot's Jordan a couple of tenths further back in fourth.

After pre-qualifying successfully at the last two Grands Prix, Olivier Grouillard missed out this time in fifth place for Fondmetal. The Modena Lambos were again sixth and seventh, with Nicola Larini again faster than Eric van de Poele. Nine tenths of a second further back in eighth was Pedro Chaves in the Coloni.

Pre-qualifying classification

Qualifying report
In qualifying Nigel Mansell took pole in front of his home fans, with title rival Ayrton Senna second. Riccardo Patrese was third, followed by Gerhard Berger, Alain Prost, Jean Alesi, Roberto Moreno, Nelson Piquet, Maurício Gugelmin, and Stefano Modena.

Qualifying classification

Race

Race report

Senna made a rocket start to lead Mansell, while Patrese was the first casualty of the day, having been bumped off by Berger (Patrese retired after the first lap as a result). Senna's lead did not last for long as Mansell re-passed him going into Stowe corner. Roberto Moreno in the Benetton retired from sixth place with a gearbox failure on lap 22.

Mansell and Senna proceeded to rocket off into the distance while Berger, Prost, and Alesi squabbled over third place, with Alesi emerging ahead; he would later retire after colliding with Aguri Suzuki while trying to lap the Japanese driver's Lola. 

Andrea de Cesaris had a huge accident on Lap 41 when his suspension failed at Abbey corner, his car bounced back across the track and narrowly missed Satoru Nakajima's Tyrrell; de Cesaris was unhurt.

At the front it was all Mansell as the Englishman recorded his second win in succession, while rival Senna ran out of fuel on the last lap and he was classified fourth. Berger ended up second, followed by Prost, Senna, Piquet, and Bertrand Gachot's Jordan. Mansell now trailed Senna by only 18 points and momentum was on his side.

In terms of having to pre-qualify, Brabham would have needed their top car at least in 7th position to demote the Leyton House team, but neither Brundle nor Blundell finished the race (Brundle retired with a broken throttle and Mark Blundell retired with engine failure later in the race on lap 53).

Race classification

Championship standings after the race

Drivers' Championship standings

Constructors' Championship standings

References

British Grand Prix
British Grand Prix
Grand Prix